Dspace may refer to:
 DSpace, a software package for digital repositories
 DSPACE, a complexity measure in computational complexity theory
 dSPACE GmbH, the company dSPACE GmbH (Germany) or its US subsidiary